The Sternewirth Privilege is a tradition in breweries where the brewery workers and visitors are given access to free beer from the brewery taproom (The Sternewirth) when they feel thirsty.

Notably, the term was explained by Mike Rowe when he helped out at Newport Distilling Company on the Discovery Channel program Dirty Jobs.

References

Brewing